Hesperoconopa is a genus of crane fly in the family Limoniidae.

Distribution
North America, India and the Russian Far East.

Species
H. acutistyla Savchenko, 1980
H. anthracina Alexander, 1976
H. aperta (Coquillett, 1905)
H. dolichophallus (Alexander, 1948)
H. melanderi (Alexander, 1945)
H. pilipennis (Alexander, 1918)
H. pugilis (Alexander, 1952)
H. sikkimensis Alexander, 1962

References

Limoniidae
Nematocera genera
Diptera of North America
Diptera of Asia